Eureka is a city in and the county seat of Greenwood County, Kansas, United States.  As of the 2020 census, the population of the city was 2,332.

History

The first settlement at Eureka was in 1857. The first post office in Eureka was established in August 1858. Eureka was laid out in 1867, and it was incorporated in 1870. The city is named from the Greek expression Eureka, meaning "I have found it".

2016 tornado
An EF2 tornado struck Eureka on July 7, 2016 at 9:45 pm. Over 143 total structures, including at least 50 homes, businesses, a nursing home, and grain elevator were damaged. No people were injured.

2018 tornado
An EF3 tornado struck Eureka on June 26, 2018 at 7:21 pm (daylight). A total of 175 structures were damaged or destroyed. 78 homes were damaged (12 not livable, 10 totaled), and 8 people were injured.

Geography
Eureka is located along the Fall River at  (37.822745, −96.289583).

Climate
The climate in this area is characterized by hot, humid summers and generally mild to cool winters. According to the Köppen Climate Classification system, Eureka has a humid subtropical climate, abbreviated "Cfa" on climate maps.

Demographics

2010 census
As of the census of 2010, there were 2,633 people, 1,171 households, and 663 families living in the city. The racial makeup of the city was 95.2% White, 0.2% African American, 0.9% Native American, 0.4% Asian, 1.1% from other races, and 2.2% from two or more races. Hispanic or Latino of any race were 5.3% of the population.

There were 1,171 households, of which 27.2% had children under the age of 18 living with them, 41.0% were married couples living together, 10.4% had a female householder with no husband present, 5.2% had a male householder with no wife present, and 43.4% were non-families. 39.3% of all households were made up of individuals, and 18.8% had someone living alone who was 65 years of age or older. The average household size was 2.17 and the average family size was 2.86.

The median age in the city was 43.2 years. 23.7% of residents were under the age of 18; 6.9% were between the ages of 18 and 24; 21.5% were from 25 to 44; 25.5% were from 45 to 64; and 22.3% were 65 years of age or older. The gender makeup of the city was 47.9% male and 52.1% female.

2000 census
As of the census of 2000, there were 2,914 people, 1,278 households, and 756 families living in the city. The racial makeup of the city was 96.26% White, 0.14% African American, 0.79% Native American, 0.14% Asian, 0.96% from other races, and 1.72% from two or more races. Hispanic or Latino of any race were 2.64% of the population.

There were 1,278 households, out of which 26.1% had children under the age of 18 living with them, 46.2% were married couples living together, 8.8% had a female householder with no husband present, and 40.8% were non-families. 38.1% of all households were made up of individuals, and 21.8% had someone living alone who was 65 years of age or older. The average household size was 2.18 and the average family size was 2.85.

In the city, the population was spread out, with 23.2% under the age of 18, 7.8% from 18 to 24, 22.4% from 25 to 44, 19.4% from 45 to 64, and 27.3% who were 65 years of age or older. The median age was 42 years. For every 100 females, there were 85.1 males. For every 100 females age 18 and over, there were 78.8 males.

The median income for a household in the city was $26,410, and the median income for a family was $36,667. Males had a median income of $27,066 versus $20,870 for females. The per capita income for the city was $15,142. About 9.0% of families and 14.8% of the population were below the poverty line, including 18.4% of those under age 18 and 12.3% of those age 65 or over.

Education
The community is served by Eureka USD 389 public school district.

Transportation

Airport
Eureka Municipal Airport is a city-owned, public-use airport located two nautical miles (4 km) north of the central business district of Eureka.

Area attractions
 Greenwood Hotel, a historic hotel and cattle trading center

Former Attractions
 Eureka Downs, defunct horse racing facility
 Utopia College, former two-year college founded by Roger Babson
 Fort Montgomery, a frontier military fort

Notable people
 Jim Brothers (1941–2013), figurative sculptor
 Charles Errickson (1897–1985), head football coach at Ottawa University, head football and basketball coach at Washburn University
 John Erickson (1863–1946), lawyer, 8th governor of Montana, and United States senator
 Lamon Harkness (1850–1915), businessman and Standard Oil heir
 Donald L. Hollowell (1919-2004), lawyer who represented Martin Luther King Jr.
 Fred Jackson (1868–1931), U.S. representative from Kansas.
 Kathy Patrick, author and founder of Pulpwood Queens
 Tyrel Reed (1989), basketball player who played for the University of Kansas
 Wes Santee (1932–2010), middle distance runner
Eric Smith, member of the Kansas House of Representatives
 Bob Whittaker (1939), U.S. representative from Kansas 1979 to 1991
 John Woods (1911–1950), United States Army master sergeant; executioner at Nuremberg Trials

Gallery
 Historic Images of Eureka, Special Photo Collections at Wichita State University Library

See also
 National Register of Historic Places listings in Greenwood County, Kansas
 Eureka Atchison, Topeka and Santa Fe Railroad Depot
 Eureka Carnegie Library
 Greenwood Hotel
 Robertson House

References

Further reading

External links

 
 Eureka - Directory of Public Officials
 Greenwood County Historical Society Museum
 Eureka city map, KDOT

 
Cities in Kansas
Cities in Greenwood County, Kansas
County seats in Kansas
1857 establishments in Kansas Territory